Trusham is a small village in the Teign Valley, between Newton Abbot and Exeter, in Devon, England. The name originates from the Celtic Trisma, meaning "brushwood" or "fallen leaves". It became Trisme for about 400 years, and then in the 16th century Tryssame or Trysham. A pub, the Cridford Inn, was opened in 1985 by converting part of an old farmhouse and adjoining barn.

The Church of St Michael is an ancient stone building in the early English and Perpendicular styles with traces of Norman work. The church was thoroughly restored in 1865, when the stained east window and a smaller one were inserted as memorials to the Rev. William Edward Brendon, who died in 1864. There is also a memorial to John Stooke which mentions a charity he set up for the church and the poor of nearby Bovey Tracey.

Trusham was the ancestral home of the Causley family, whose descendants include the poet Charles Causley and the folk singer Jim Causley. Causley's poem "Trusham" is an account of a return he made to the village in his later years; a reflection on one's family roots, what it is to be distant from those, and the legacies we leave behind us. Jim Causley's setting of this poem—amongst a number of other poems by his distant relation—is a modern song-setting, and is available on the album Cyprus Well. A later poem, "The Prodigal Son", recounts a further visit by Causley to his ancestral village, linking once again the local geography, history and landscape with the First World War and his own family memories. In 2007, Trusham held the first Charles Causley Festival in conjunction with the Charles Causley Society of Launceston. There is a plaque in the village to celebrate Causley's life and the Charles Causley Society hold regular events in Trusham such as Causley readings and poems set to music, hog roasts and barn dancing.

The now disused and privately-owned Trusham railway station was part of the Teign Valley Line. Although the school closed in November 1948, its Victorian building is now the Village Hall.

The Doomsday survey of 1086 recorded a settlement of 23 households (four of villagers, nine of smallholders, ten of slaves). Eight hundred years later, the 1881 Census recorded a very small growth, with 41 households and a population of 177; however, in Kelly’s 1901 Directory of Devonshire, the population had fallen to 165. By 2001, whilst the number of households had increased to 60, the population had fallen further to 144.

The village is accessed via minor roads which are predominantly single track with passing places. The A38 passes within  at Chudleigh. The centre of the village has the O S grid reference SX 854 821 and for sat nav users the postcode is TQ13 0NW.

Notes

References

Villages in Devon